Piedmont is a historic home and farm located near Greenwood, Albemarle County, Virginia. The main house was built in two sections.  The older sections is a two-story, three-bay, gable-roofed log half (now stuccoed), that was built possibly as early as the late-18th century.  Attached perpendicular to the log section is a two-story, gable roofed brick half built in 1838.  The house exhibits Greek Revival and Federal design details. Also on the property are a log smokehouse, log slave cabin and the ruins of a large stone chimney and hearth.

It was added to the National Register of Historic Places in 1991.

References

Houses on the National Register of Historic Places in Virginia
Federal architecture in Virginia
Greek Revival houses in Virginia
Houses completed in 1838
Houses in Albemarle County, Virginia
National Register of Historic Places in Albemarle County, Virginia
Slave cabins and quarters in the United States